The Johnson County Poor Farm and Asylum Historic District is a nationally recognized historic district located in Iowa City, Iowa, United States.  It was listed on the National Register of Historic Places in 2014.    At the time of its nomination it consisted of 11 resources, which included three contributing buildings, two contributing sites, four contributing structures and two non-contributing buildings.  It also includes the First Johnson County Asylum (c. 1861), which was individually listed on the National Register.  The remaining buildings and structures are agricultural in nature, and were built from the late 19th century to the early 20th century.

The original facility to care for the poor and mentally ill was built in 1855 (no longer extant) and wings were added around 1861.  The remaining wing of the first asylum building was moved to its present location in 1888 and used as a hog building after a new residential building had been completed two years prior.  That later building is no longer extant and Chatham Oaks, a mental health facility, was built on that site in 1964.  The second contributing site, apart from the location of the agricultural buildings, is where the cemetery for this facility is believed to be located.  Archaeological studies of the area indicate that there may be hundreds of burials in that location.

References

Historic districts in Iowa City, Iowa
National Register of Historic Places in Iowa City, Iowa
Historic districts on the National Register of Historic Places in Iowa
Farms on the National Register of Historic Places in Iowa
Archaeological sites on the National Register of Historic Places in Iowa